Cariri do Tocantins is a municipality located in the Brazilian state of Tocantins. Its population was 4,441 (2020) and its area is 1,129 km2.

References

Municipalities in Tocantins